Max Bailey (3 February 1997) is a professional rugby league footballer who plays as a  for the Sunshine Coast Falcons. 

He previously played for the Sydney Roosters in the NRL.

Career

2020
Bailey made his first grade debut in round 13 of the 2020 NRL season for the Sydney Roosters against the St George Illawarra Dragons.As of 2021 Max has worked as a science teacher at Nambour State College.

References

External links
Sydney Roosters profile 
QRL profile

1997 births
Living people
Australian rugby league players
Rugby league locks
Rugby league players from Wollongong
Sydney Roosters players
Sunshine Coast Falcons players